Idridgehay is a village in the English county of Derbyshire.
  The appropriate civil parish is called Idridgehay and Alton. The population of this parish at the 2011 census was 275.

Geography
Idridgehay lies south of the town Wirksworth west of the town of Belper in the valley of the River Ecclesbourne. Idridgehay Green is immediately to its west and the hamlet of Ireton Wood a mile to its south.

Transport
The village lies on the B5023 road that connects Wirksworth and Duffield. However the main bus service, route 6.1 operated by Trentbarton, is between Matlock and Belper. Idridgehay railway station (re-opened in 2008) is on the Ecclesbourne Valley Railway, a community-owned and locally managed heritage railway venture having reopened and operate the railway between those towns.

Governance
Idridgehay forms part of the civil parish of Idridgehay and Alton which, in turn, forms part of the non-metropolitan district of Amber Valley.

Buildings

The parish church, St James, was designed by Henry Isaac Stevens and consecrated in 1845.

See also
Listed buildings in Idridgehay and Alton

References

External links

Photo of Parish Church
Brief description of village

Villages in Derbyshire
Towns and villages of the Peak District
Derbyshire Dales